Henry Douglas Morpeth Haszard (16 January 1862 – 19 September 1938) was a New Zealand surveyor and land commissioner. He was born in Mangonui, Northland, New Zealand on 16 January 1862.

References

1862 births
1938 deaths
New Zealand surveyors
People from the Northland Region